The following is a list of the 44 municipalities (comuni) of the Metropolitan City of Venice, Veneto, Italy.

List

See also 
List of municipalities of Italy

References 

 01
Venice
 
Metropolitan City of Venice